Brothers McCann is an American folk-rock band, formed in 2007 in Boston, Massachusetts. The band consists of Mike McCann, Pat McCann and Erik White.

Discography
Different Colors, 2009, LP
Stereo Road, 2013, EP
Days of Ease, 2014, LP

References

Musical groups from Massachusetts